Coulter Cottage is a historic cure cottage located at Saranac Lake, town of North Elba in Essex County, New York.

It was built between 1897 and 1899 and is a -story wood-frame structure on a stone foundation and topped by a gambrel roof in the Shingle Style. It features a sitting out porch and four upper story sleeping porches. The house was designed by noted Adirondack area architect William L. Coulter (1865–1907). It was listed on the National Register of Historic Places in 1992.

It is located in the Helen Hill Historic District.

References

Houses on the National Register of Historic Places in New York (state)
Shingle Style houses
Houses completed in 1897
Houses in Essex County, New York
National Register of Historic Places in Essex County, New York
Individually listed contributing properties to historic districts on the National Register in New York (state)
Shingle Style architecture in New York (state)